Advanced Bio-Treatment (ABT) is a biohazard response and remediation company operating in twenty-eight states.  The company employs a multitude of cleanup teams specializing in crime scene cleanup. Day-to-day business operations are overseen by a customer service driven team from the company’s corporate office located in Jacksonville, Florida.

History 
The company was founded in 2003 by Jerry Turner, a former police officer and insurance agent, whose experience working with trauma survivors and crime victims inspired him to open a business specializing in the restoration of crime scenes and unattended death scenes. The business opened with an office in Murrayville, Georgia serving primarily the Atlanta metropolitan area. The business has expanded to serve 28 states throughout the US.

Types of cleanup 
Advanced Bio-Treatment's primary scope of work is responding to situations in which the presence of biohazards such as blood or infectious disease requires specific training and experience. These situations frequently include crime scene cleanup following a burglary, battery, or homicide, unattended death scenes and suicide, infectious disease contamination from Methicillin-resistant Staphylococcus aureus (MRSA) and others, as well as trauma scenes.

Training and certification 
Handling biohazardous material is dangerous and presents a potential danger to the community and the environment. Company technicians are required to attend regular periodic training including certification in OSHA standards and applicable EPA and state Department of Health guidelines. The company maintains certification by IICRC a certifying body for the cleaning trade.

References

External links 
 Advanced Bio Treatment Company Information Page
 CNN Living article profiling Advanced Bio Treatment
 Kentucky Coroner's Forensic Resources

Companies based in Florida